Ambrières-les-Vallées is a commune in the Mayenne department in northwestern France. It is on the border of Normandy.

Population

Notable people
 

Louis Tanquerel des Planches (1810–1862), physician and researcher

See also
Communes of Mayenne
Parc naturel régional Normandie-Maine

References

Communes of Mayenne